Viktor Vladimirovich Novozhilov (5 June 1950 in Leningrad, Soviet Union (now St. Petersburg, Russia) – 1991) was a Russian wrestler who received a Silver medal in the 1976 Summer Olympics.

References

1950 births
1991 deaths
Olympic wrestlers of the Soviet Union
Wrestlers at the 1976 Summer Olympics
Russian male sport wrestlers
Olympic silver medalists for the Soviet Union
Olympic medalists in wrestling
Medalists at the 1976 Summer Olympics